1989 Emperor's Cup Final was the 69th final of the Emperor's Cup competition. The final was played at National Stadium in Tokyo on January 1, 1990. Nissan Motors won the championship.

Overview
Defending champion Nissan Motors won their 4th title, by defeating Yamaha Motors 3–2. Nissan Motors was featured a squad consisting of Shigetatsu Matsunaga, Tetsuji Hashiratani, Kazushi Kimura, Nobutoshi Kaneda and Takashi Mizunuma.

Match details

See also
1989 Emperor's Cup

References

Emperor's Cup
1989 in Japanese football
Yokohama F. Marinos matches
Júbilo Iwata matches